The 2005–06 All-Ireland Junior Club Football Championship was the fifth staging of the All-Ireland Junior Club Football Championship since its establishment by the Gaelic Athletic Association.

The All-Ireland final was played on 19 February 2006 at Croke Park in Dublin, between Ardfert and Loughrea. Ardfert won the match by 1-07 to 0-09 to claim their first ever championship title.

All-Ireland Junior Club Football Championship

All-Ireland final

References

2005 in Irish sport
2006 in Irish sport
All-Ireland Junior Club Football Championship
All-Ireland Junior Club Football Championship